Aggressive Inline is a 2002 sports video game developed by Z-Axis, published by Acclaim Entertainment under the AKA Acclaim label, and released for the PlayStation 2, Xbox, and GameCube. The game features professional inline skaters, including Chris Edwards, Eito Yasutoko, Franky Morales, Jaren Grob and Taïg Khris.

A different game of the same name was developed by Full Fat and released for the Game Boy Advance.

Gameplay
The gameplay focuses on completing goals given by talking to characters within each level. While some goals involve gaining a certain number of points in a specific time, many of the goals involve doing tricks on and off of pieces of the environment (for example: one level asks the player to grind three traffic lights, each one placed at a larger distance and facing a different direction). Another innovative feature focused on a player leveling system where the player would perform better in different areas of skating skill by practicing them repeatedly. For instance, if the player does many air tricks throughout the course of the game, each successful trick would create points in the player's air trick statistics. When the points reach a certain number, the player's air tricks will move up a level, making it easier to perform air tricks faster and more efficiently. The same actions apply to grinding, speed, wall riding, skating backward, etc.

Reception

Aggressive Inline received "generally favorable reviews" on all platforms, with the Game Boy Advance version less favorable than the console versions, according to the review aggregation website Metacritic.

The game received praise for its wide and interactive environments, comfortable control scheme, and innovative gameplay. At the time, it was considered to be a breakthrough competitor to the Tony Hawk series, even being the first to include some elements that would later become standard in the Tony Hawk games, most notably not confining players to rigidly timed play sessions. The game did, however, borrow some elements from the Tony Hawk franchise, notably the seamless combo transitions from Tony Hawk's Pro Skater 3, which had introduced the revert mechanic (called a cess slide in Aggressive Inline). Some critics, such as IGNs Craig Harris, lamented that Full Fat did not recreate the home console version's structure in handheld form, instead opting for a check list plus top score approach to level completion.

GameSpot named the PlayStation 2 version the third-best video game of May 2002. It was nominated for GameSpots annual "Best Alternative Sports Game on GameCube", "Best Alternative Sports Game on Xbox", and "Best Game No One Played on PlayStation 2" awards. However, its Game Boy Advance version won the publication's annual "Best Sound on Game Boy Advance" award. The game was also nominated for "Outstanding Original Sports Game" by the National Academy of Video Game Trade Reviewers, but lost to Jet Set Radio Future. It was also a runner-up for Console Sports Game at the Academy of Interactive Arts & Sciences' 6th Annual Interactive Achievement Awards, which went to Madden NFL 2003.

References

External links

2002 video games
Acclaim Entertainment games
Aggressive skating
Full Fat games
Game Boy Advance games
GameCube games
Multiplayer and single-player video games
PlayStation 2 games
Roller skating video games
Video games developed in the United Kingdom
Xbox games
Video games developed in the United States